The 1955–56 Norwegian 1. Divisjon season was the 17th season of ice hockey in Norway. Eight teams participated in the league, and Gamlebyen won the championship.

Regular season

External links 
 Norwegian Ice Hockey Federation

Nor
GET-ligaen seasons
1955 in Norwegian sport
1956 in Norwegian sport